Kanti Biswas, was an Indian communist politician and former minister from West Bengal.

Early life 
Kanti Biswas was born in Namasudra community to Jogendranath Biswas at Bukrail, Kashiani, Faridpur district, Bengal Presidency in British India.

He did M.Com. and was deeply involved in the student politics of Dacca University, starting with the Bengali Language Movement and later started teaching in Quaid E Azam Memorial College.

Kanti represented the National Awami Party and fought against Sheikh Mujibur Rahman in an election. In 1960, he migrated to West Bengal, India when government of Pakistan banned Communist Party and issued a warrant against him.

Political career 
In 1967, he earned the membership of CPI(M) and was associated with the activities of Kisan Sabha, UCRC and DYFI. He was also the member of Dalit Shoshan Mukti Manch and president of Samajik Naya Mancha.

He was one of the few Dalit leaders from CPI(M) who reached till ministerial level during their Government and was also the longest serving Education Minister of the state.

 In 1977, he first elected from Gaighata constituency in state legislative assembly elections and was allotted with Ministry of Youth Affairs and Home (Passports).
 In 1982 and 1987, he was re-elected for Gaighata seat successfully.
 He was elected twice from Sandeshkhali constituency in 1996 and 2001.
From 1982 to 2006 he served as the Minister of School Education of Bengal. He was the first dalit education minister in India.
 In 1981, he was elected to CPI(M) state committee and in 2012 to CPI(M) State Control Commission which he hold till his death.
He had written a memoir Amar Jeevan: Kichu Katha (Bengali) (আমার জীবন: কিছু কথা) which was published in 2014.

Death 
He died in 2016 in a private hospital due to lung infections.

References 

West Bengal politicians
1932 births
2016 deaths
Communist Party of India (Marxist) politicians from West Bengal
Dalit leaders
University of Dhaka alumni